Dhananjay is a 2017 Indian Bengali language drama film directed by Arindam Sil and produced by Shrikant Mohta and Mahendra Soni under the banner of SVF Entertainment. The film featuring Mimi Chakraborty, Anirban Bhattacharya and Kaushik Sen, is story of Dhananjoy Chatterjee, a security guard hanged for the rape and murder of a student. The film was released on 11 August 2017.

Plot

Dhananjoy's story is based on the conviction of Dhananjoy Chatterjee, accused for the gruesome murder of Hetal Parekh, which took place in the year 1990. On the basis of circumstantial evidence and on the basis of the deceased mother's statement, Dhananjoy Chatterjee a security guard, was executed and hanged to death on the early hours of 15 August 2004, after serving imprisonment for 14 long years and after having appealed to all levels of court in the country; and finally, to the President of India.

Cast
 Anirban Bhattacharya as Dhananjoy Chatterjee
 
 Kanchan Mullick as Public Prosecutor
 Kaushik Sen as Shibraj Chaudhuri, advocate 
 Mimi Chakraborty as Advocate Kavya Sinha
 Paran Bandopadhyay as Dhananjoy's father
 Anusha Viswanathan as Hema Parekh
 Sudipta Chakraborty as Surabhi Parekh
 Dilip Dave
 Deepanjan Ghosh
 Mir Afsar Ali as defense counsel

References

External links
 

2017 films
Bengali-language Indian films
2010s Bengali-language films
Films directed by Arindam Sil
Films scored by Bickram Ghosh
Indian drama films